Nilcedes Soares de Magalhães (née Guimarães; born 19 October 1934), known professionally as Glória Menezes, is a Brazilian actress.

Life and career

Glória Menezes was born in Pelotas, in the state of Rio Grande do Sul. Her real name, Nilcedes,  is the joining of both her father's name, José Nilo, and her mother's name, Mercedes.

At the age of six, she and her family moved to São Paulo, where she attended  University of São Paulo's School of Dramatic Arts and founded a theater group called Jovens Independentes. Her professional career began on São Paulo's TV Tupi in 1959, in the soap opera Um Lugar ao Sol, directed by Dionísio Azevedo. In 1962 she appeared in the film O Pagador de Promessas, alongside Leonardo Villar and Anselmo Duarte. In 1963, alongside Tarcísio Meira, she starred in the first daily soap opera on Brazilian television, 2-5499 Ocupado, broadcast by TV Excelsior. It was during this soap opera that the two actors began dating.

Partial filmography 

Um Lugar ao Sol (1959, TV Series) - Eloá
Há Sempre o Amanhã (1960, TV Series) - Lucy
TV de Comédia (1960-1962, TV Series) - Elvira / Elza / Suzy
TV de Vanguarda (1960-1962, TV Series) - Maria Clara / Jane Eyre
O Pagador de Promessas (1962) - Rosa
A Estranha Clementine (1962, TV Series) - Clementine
2-5499 Ocupado (1963, TV Series) - Emily
Lampião, O Rei do Cangaço (1964)
Uma Sombra em Minha Vida (1964, TV Series) - Maria Rosa
A Deusa Vencida (1965, TV Series) - Cecília  
Pedra redonda 39 (1965, TV Series) - Jane
Almas de Pedra (1966, TV Series) - Cristina Ramalho
As Minas de Prata (1966-1967, TV Series) - Zana
O Grande Segredo (1967, TV Series) - Marta / Ana Célia
Sangue e Areia (1967-1968, TV Series) - Doña Sol
Passo dos Ventos (1968-1969, TV Series) - Vivian Chevalier
Rosa Rebelde (1969, TV Series) - Rosa Malena / Simone Grandet
O Impossível Acontece (1969) - Lúcia (segment "Eu, Ela e o Outro")
Máscara da Traição (1969) - Cristina Almeida
Irmãos Coragem (1970-1971, TV Series) - Lara / Diana / Márcia
O Homem Que Deve Morrer (1971-1972, TV Series) - Esther
Independência ou Morte (1972) - Marquesa de Santos
Caso Especial (1972-1973, TV Series) - Hermínia / Marina / Marguerite Gautier
O Descarte (1973) - Cláudia Land
Cavalo de Aço (1973, TV Series) - Miranda
O Semideus (1973-1974, TV Series) - Ângela
O Grito (1975-1976, TV Series) - Marta
Espelho Mágico (1977, TV Series) - Leila Lombardi (Rosana, em "Coquetel de amor")
Pai Herói (1979, TV Series) - Ana Preta
O Caçador de Esmeraldas (1979) - Maria Betim
Jogo da Vida (1981-1982, TV Series) - Jordana
Guerra dos Sexos (1983-1984, TV Series) - Roberta Leone
Para Viver um Grande Amor (1984)
Corpo a Corpo (1984-1985, TV Series) - Tereza Fonseca
Brega & Chique (1987, TV Series) - Rosemere
Rainha da Sucata (1990, TV Series) - Laura "Laurinha" Albuquerque Figueroa
Xuxa e a Fábrica de Ilusões (1991) - Herself
Deus nos Acuda (1992-1993, TV Series) - Bábara Silveira Bueno (Baby Bueno)
A Próxima Vítima (1995, TV Series) - Julia Braga
Vira-Lata (1996, TV Series) - Stela
Torre de Babel (1998-1999, TV Series) - Marta Leme Toledo
Porto dos Milagres (2001, TV Series) - Dona Coló (primeira fase)
O Beijo do Vampiro (2002-2003, TV Series) - Zoroastra
Da Cor do Pecado (2004, TV Series) - Kiki de Queensburg
Um Só Coração (2004, TV Mini-Series) - Camila
Senhora do Destino (2004-2005, TV Series) - Baronesa Laura
Se Eu Fosse Você (2006) - Vivinha
Páginas da Vida (2006-2007, TV Series) - Amalia
A Favorita (2008-2009, TV Series) - Irene
Cama de Gato (2009-2010, TV Series) - Herself
Louco por Elas (2012-2013, TV Series) - Violeta Corrêa Santiago
Joia Rara (2013-2014, TV Series) - Pérola Fonseca Hauser (adult)
Totalmente Demais (2015-2016, TV Series) - Stelinha Carneiro de Alcântara
Tá no Ar, a TV na TV (2018, TV Series) - Herself
Os Casais que Amamos (2020) - Herself
Ensina-me a viver (2021) - Maude

References

External links
 

1934 births
Living people
People from Pelotas
Brazilian telenovela actresses
Brazilian television actresses
Brazilian film actresses